Chaguaramas is a town in northern Venezuela, in the state of Guárico. It is the shire town of the Chaguaramas Municipality.

Transport 

In 2006, it was proposed to build a new railway line to this station.

See also 

 Railway stations in Venezuela

References 

Populated places in Guárico